Year 304 (CCCIV) was a leap year starting on Saturday (link will display the full calendar) of the Julian calendar. It was known in the Roman Empire as the Year of the Consulship of Diocletian and Maximian (or, less frequently, year 1057 Ab urbe condita). The denomination 304 for this year has been used since the early medieval period, when the Anno Domini calendar era became the prevalent method in Europe for naming years.

Events

By place

Roman Empire 
 Caesar Galerius, perhaps accompanied by Emperor Diocletian, wins his fourth and final victory over the Carpi. Many of the surviving Carpi and Bastarnae are resettled in the Roman Empire, where they are split up. The Bastarnae are not attested after this time, and the Carpi are attested only once more in the 310s.
 Diocletian, while inspecting the Danube border, becomes seriously ill.
 Caesar Constantius I besieges a Germanic raiding force on an island in the Rhine and forces their surrender.

Asia 
 Sixteen Kingdoms: The Wu Hu uprising establishes the Han Kingdom, under Liu Yuan.    
 Sichuan earns its independence from China.
 Biryu becomes king of the Korean kingdom of Baekje.

By topic

Religion
 October 25 – Pope Marcellinus dies at Rome after an 8-year reign. The papal throne will remain vacant until 308.

Births

Deaths 

 October 25 – Pope Marcellinus
 December 25 – Saint Anastasia (martyred)
Date unknown
 Saint Afra (martyred by fire)
 Saint Agape, Chionia, and Irene (martyred)
 Saint Agnes (martyred)
 Saint Alban (possibly 309)
 Bunseo of Baekje, king of Baekje (Korea)
 Saint Florian (martyred)
 Saint Gorgonius of Nicomedia (martyred)
 Saint Juliana of Nicomedia (martyred)
 Saint Lucy of Syracuse (martyred)
 Saint Margaret (martyred)
 Saint Pancras (martyred)
 Saint Philomena (martyred)
 Sima Ai, Chinese prince of the Jin dynasty (b. 277)
 Saints Theodora and Didymus (martyred)
 Saint Vincent of Saragossa (martyred)

References